Jan Frode Andersen (born 29 August 1972) is a Norwegian former tennis player. He played tennis for Norway, including competing in at least 60 countries over a span of 8 years after turning professional in 1997. He represented Norway in the Davis Cup for 10 consecutive years compiling a 30-22 record (25-14 in singles). His highest ATP ranking was 135. This makes him the third best player in Norwegian history, after Christian Ruud and Casper Ruud.

He was also a television commentator for the Norwegian Broadcasting Corporation, and he earned a bachelor's degree in Business & Administration from the University of Arizona in 1996.

Born in Asker, he grew up in Hamar.

ATP Challenger and ITF Futures finals

Singles: 12 (5–7)

Doubles: 6 (0–6)

Performance timeline

Singles

References

External links
 
 
 

1972 births
Living people
Norwegian male tennis players
University of Arizona alumni
Tennis commentators
People from Asker
Sportspeople from Hamar
21st-century Norwegian people